Le Saut à la couverture (also known as Brimade dans une caserne) is an 1895 French short black-and-white silent documentary film directed and produced by Louis Lumière.

The film formed part of the first commercial presentation of the Lumière Cinématographe on 28 December 1895 at the Salon Indien, Grand Café, 14 Boulevard des Capuchins, Paris.

Production
As with all early Lumière movies, this film was made in a 35 mm format with an aspect ratio of 1.33:1. It was filmed by means of the Cinématographe, an all-in-one camera, which also serves as a film projector and developer.

Plot

Four men stand holding what appears to be a blanket, while one wearing a hat stands watching. A sixth man then runs towards them and attempts to jump into the blanket. He attempts this unsuccessfully twice in a row failing to jump high enough. On the third attempt he is able to jump and spin in the air, nearly clearing in the blanket. The man who are holding it then flip it a little in the air causing him to fall to the ground. His fourth attempt is more successful and he is able to roll on the blanket and land on his feet at the other side. He runs around for a fifth and final attempt but this is less successful and he gets stuck in the blanket and has difficulty getting out despite the attempts by the four men to throw him free.

References

External links
 Complete video on Youtube
 Complete video at The Lumiere Institute (requires QuickTime)
 

1895 films
French black-and-white films
French silent short films
Films directed by Auguste and Louis Lumière
1890s short documentary films
Black-and-white documentary films
French short documentary films